Eldon Wayne Hoke (March 23, 1958 – April 19, 1997), nicknamed El Duce,  was an American musician best known as the drummer and lead singer of the shock rock band the Mentors, as well as other acts, including Chinas Comidas and the Screamers.

Apart from his musical career, Eldon was also an actor who appeared in several films as an extra, and discussed his hugely-controversial band and lifestyle on the notorious Jerry Springer and Wally George TV talk-shows.

Today El Duce is remembered as a cultural pioneer who, using his dark sense of humor, destroyed taboos in rock music regarding onstage speech and behavior, and who set a precedent for today's most outrageous and extreme musical acts.

The Mentors' songs were covered by artists including Frank Zappa, Black Label Society, GWAR and Koffin Kats, and quoted by Guns N' Roses, Anthrax and Dr. Know (in "Cornshucker", "I'm The Man" and "Fist F*ck", respectively).

Early life

Hoke was born in Seattle, Washington to mother Doris Hope and father Walter Hoke. His father designed bombs for the Vietnam War, and he was also abusive towards him and his sister. He attended Roosevelt High School where he formed the Mentors with school friends Eric Carlson and Steve Broy after he was expelled for repeatedly vandalizing the school.

Career

The Mentors

Hoke and the Mentors worked to gain attention through farcical demonstrations of political incorrectness. The band's guitarist, Eric Carlson, renamed himself "Sickie Wifebeater", and the group often appeared in public wearing black executioner hoods.

During the 1985 U.S. Senate Committee on Commerce, Science and Transportation's hearings into the proliferation of "obscene" lyrics in popular music, the Reverend Jeff Ling recited the lyrics to the Mentors song, "Golden Shower" to musician Frank Zappa, who opposed the hearings. The lyrics, which included the line, "Bend up and smell my anal vapor/Your face is my toilet paper" prompted Zappa and others to denounce the hearings as a farce.

Kurt Cobain death claim

After the body of Nirvana frontman Kurt Cobain was discovered in the greenhouse of Cobain's Lake Washington home on April 8, 1994, Hoke began making the claim that Cobain's wife, Courtney Love, had offered to pay him to kill Cobain. Hoke promoted his story in such media outlets as TV's Jerry Springer Show, The National Enquirer weekly tabloid, and in Nick Broomfield's documentary film, Kurt & Courtney. In 1996, Hoke passed a lie detector test when claiming that Love had offered him $50,000 to kill Kurt Cobain. In his interview in the Kurt and Courtney film, recorded on April 11, 1997, El Duce again claimed that Love had offered him $50,000 to "whack" Kurt Cobain, and further claimed that he knew who did kill Cobain (giving the name "Allen" some say from the band Kill Allen Wrench), but said he would "let the FBI catch him".

Other appearances
In addition to his musical career, Hoke also worked as an extra in television (such talk shows like Hot Seat with Wally George and The Jerry Springer Show, and Tales From The Crypt episode), movies (including the science fiction musical Population: 1, starring his bandmate Tomata Du Plenty; Two Idiots in Hollywood, directed by Stephen Tobolowsky; and Du-beat-e-o, starring Joan Jett), and in music video productions.

In 1998 Backstage Sluts (lately shortened and re-edited as Backstage Pass: Uncensored), directed by Matt Zane, was released — a movie wherein famous rockers (including members of Motörhead, Korn, Limp Bizkit, Sugar Ray and Insane Clown Posse) recount their wildest sexual moments, while actual porn stars acted them out. The film contains a penultimate interview with El Duce from 1997, in which he drunkenly declares his taste in the opposite sex: "I like nasty women. I like... homeless women."

Death
On April 19, 1997, one day after his final performance and talking to Brent Alden, and eight days after filming his interview with Nick Broomfield for the Kurt & Courtney documentary, Hoke was found dead on the railroad tracks in Riverside, California. He was "decapitated in the accident — he was hit full on by a freight train doing 60 MPH", according to Steve Broy, the Mentors' bass player. Subsequent tests indicated a high blood alcohol content and thus Hoke's official cause of death was given by the coroner's office as "misadventure". Al Jourgensen (of the industrial metal band Ministry) wrote in his autobiography that El Duce was killed by the train when some fans on the other side of the railroad tracks called his name and, as he attempted to cross to meet them, his toes became stuck in the track. Due to the timing of his death 8 days after the Kurt and Courtney interview, people have speculated that his death was related to the statements he made that Courtney Love offered him $50,000 to "whack" Cobain, and that someone named "Allen" took the offer.

According to the self-published book Truth Is Funnier Than Fiction by Mentors bass player Steve Broy, the whole story was concocted by Mentors associate Rev. Bud Green in order to sell to supermarket tabloids.

Discography

With the Mentors 
Studio albums

 1982 – Trash Bag (a.k.a. "Get Up & Die")
 1985 – You Axed for It!
 1986 – Up the Dose
 1989 – Sex, Drugs & Rock 'n' Roll
 1990 – Rock Bible
 1991 – To the Max
 1994 – Houses of the Horny

Singles

 2007 – Shotgun Suicide [1997]
 2009 – Oblivion Train [1977]
 2018 – Nuthang [1977]

Live albums
 1983 – Live at the Whisky / Cathay De Grande
 1987 – Live in Frisco [1983]
 2017 – To the Max "Live" [1992]

Featured on

 1984 – Various artists – The Sound of Hollywood – Copulation

Solo releases 
 1991 – The Man, the Myth, the Legend
 1992 – Booze and Broads
 1993 – Musical Pornography
 1993 – Slave to thy Master
 1995 – Buttfucking Man
 1996 – Lock Up Yer Daughters
 1997 – Karaoke King I
 1997 – Karaoke King II
 1997 – Perverts on Parade
 2010 – God  [1996]
 2011 – El Duce's XXX-Mas  [1996]
 2018 – Symphony  [1991 & 1996]
 2018 – Three Second Man (single)
 2018 – The Man of the House (single)
 2018 – Harvest Time in Humboldt County (single)
 2018 – El Duce & The Sex Devils – Man, Myth, Live!  [1991]
 2020 – 1985
 2021 – Dead Man Rocking (EP)

As featured artist 
 1987 – Zoetrope – A Life of Crime
 1991 – Dr. Heathen Scum II – El Magnifico Musicione
 1991 – Insect on Acid – Sex Sex Sex
 1996 – Love Sandwich – Hollywood 4-Way
 1997 – Sloth - Bring On The Gaffs

Videography
 1981 – Get Up & Die
 1987 – Fuck Movie
 1990 – A Piece of Sinema
 1990 – The Wretched World of The Mentors
 1991 – Hollywood Head Bash
 1991 – Tour De Max '91
 1993 – El Duce: The Man. The Myth. The Video
 2007 – El Duce Vita
 2010 – Perverted Movie
 2017 – The Kings of Sleaze (documentary)
 2019 – The El Duce Tapes (documentary)

Appearances:
 1986 - Quiet Riot - The Wild And The Young (promo video)
 1997 - Nine Inch Nails - Closure (documentary)
 2011 - Ministry - Fix (documentary)

References

Broy, Steve (2015). Truth Is Funnier Than Fiction: My Life With Eldon Hoke and the Mentors Self Published, Second Edition p. 263-264.

External links

 The Church of El Duce
 El Duce at Encyclopaedia Metallum
 Mentors at Encyclopaedia Metallum
 El Duce Discography at Discogs

1958 births
1997 deaths
American baritones
American punk rock drummers
American male drummers
American punk rock singers
American heavy metal drummers
American heavy metal singers
Deaths by decapitation
Singers from California
Railway accident deaths in the United States
Accidental deaths in California
Mentors (band) members
20th-century American singers
Musicians from Seattle
20th-century American drummers
20th-century American male singers